Benjamin Wood (October 13, 1820 – February 21, 1900) was an American politician and  publishing entrepreneur from the state of New York during the American Civil War.

Life and career

Wood, the son of Benjamin and Rebecca (Lehman) Wood, was born in  Shelbyville, Kentucky, on October 13, 1820, and was the brother of US congressional representative and New York City Mayor Fernando Wood. The Wood family moved from Kentucky to New York City, and Benjamin Wood was educated in New York City. He entered the mercantile and shipping business, and in 1860, he purchased the New York Daily News (not to be confused with the current New York Daily News, which was founded in 1919), of which he was the editor and publisher until he died in 1900.

In 1861 the federal government effectively shut down the paper by suspending its delivery via the postal service as being sympathetic with the Confederacy. During the interval, he wrote a novel, Fort Lafayette or, Love and Secession (1862).

Wood was able to re-open the paper 18 months later. In the period from 1863 to 1865 the paper printed personal columns and the War Department alleged that they were used by Confederate spies for coded communications. The managing editor William McKellar was arrested and brought before a congressional investigative committee. After that Benjamin Wood was regarded as a traitor by many northern citizens.

Wood was elected as a Democrat to the 37th and 38th United States Congresses (March 4, 1861 – March 3, 1865) He was a member of the New York State Senate (4th D.) in 1866 and 1867 and elected to the 47th United States Congress (March 4, 1881 – March 3, 1883). He was a presidential elector in 1884.

Death and personal life
Wood died in New York City on February 21, 1900, and was interred at Calvary Cemetery in Queens. It was estimated that he left to his wife, Ida Mayfield Wood, around $2 million.

His wife Ida became a recluse and miser, who resided at New York City's Herald Square Hotel for 24 years, refusing contact with the outside world, and was the subject of a famous court case after her death in 1932, when her true identity of Ellen Walsh came to light.

References

Further reading
Wood, Benjamin. Speech of Benjamin Wood, of New York, on the State of the Union: In the House of Representatives, May 16th, 1862. Washington, D.C.: McGill, Witherow & Co., printers, 1862. 
Wood, Benjamin. Fort Lafayette, or, Love and Secession: A Novel. New York: Carleton, 1862.
David Long. The New York News, 1855-1906: Spokesman for the Underprivileged, PhD Dissertation. Columbia University, 1950.

External links

 
 
 
 Mr. Lincoln and New York: Benjamin Wood

1820 births
1900 deaths
People from Shelbyville, Kentucky
19th-century American newspaper publishers (people)
Burials at Calvary Cemetery (Queens)
People of New York (state) in the American Civil War
Democratic Party New York (state) state senators
Democratic Party members of the United States House of Representatives from New York (state)
19th-century American journalists
American male journalists
19th-century American male writers
Journalists from New York City
1884 United States presidential electors
Copperheads (politics)